Thérondels is a commune in the Aveyron department in southern France.

Villages 
Apart from Thérondels itself, the commune includes several other villages and hamlets: Le Bousquet, Campheyt, Casternac, Douzalbats, Faliès, Fieux, Frons, Gorse, Jou, Ladignac, Laussac, Longvieux, Mandilhac, Le Meyniel, Nigresserre, and Pervilhergues. Laussac is situated on a peninsula in Lake Sarrans (a reservoir). South of Douzalbats there is an airstrip for ultralight aircraft.

Population

See also
Communes of the Aveyron department

References

Communes of Aveyron
Aveyron communes articles needing translation from French Wikipedia